Eagles is a 2012 Israeli drama film directed by Dror Sabo.

Cast
  as Dina
 Yehoram Gaon as Moshka
  as Efraim

References

External links
 

2012 films
2012 drama films
2010s Hebrew-language films
Israeli drama films